Taeniotes iridescens is a species of beetle in the family Cerambycidae. It was described by Dillon and Dillon in 1941. It is known from Costa Rica, Colombia, Brazil, and Panama.

References

iridescens
Beetles described in 1941